The Scalovians, also known as the Skalvians, Schalwen and Schalmen, were a Baltic tribe related to the Prussians. According to the Chronicon terrae Prussiae of Peter of Dusburg, the now extinct Scalovians inhabited the land of Scalovia south of the Curonians and Samogitians, by the lower Neman River ca. 1240.

Geography
This region is located at both sides of the river Memel north of Nadruvians and south of  Samogitia. In the North-East it stretched to rivers Šešupė, Ežeruona and Jūra. In the East it bordered on Sudovia, in the North-West on river Minija, in the West on the Curonian Lagoon and in the South-West on river Gilija.  The center were the towns of Rusnė, Ragainė and Tilžė.

Name
The meaning is uncertain: skalwa "splinter (living split off)" or skalauti "between waters". According to Prussian legends, the tribe's name is derived from one of the sons of King Widewuto named Schalauo.

History
The inhabitants can be traced back to burial grounds with cremated remains and occasional graves of horses. Judging from the diggings, Scalovians are assumed to have been related to other Western Balts such as Curonians and more distantly to Prussians. Typical Scalovian sepulchral relics are found in Strewa, Skomanten, Jurgaiten, Nikeln, Paulaiten, Wilku Kampas, Weszaiten, Greyszönen, Lompönen and Wittgirren.

The center of Scalovia was the castle of Ragnit. Peter von Dusburg told about a wooden castle which could not be conquered by force or starvation because the inhabitants of the stronghold had put in an artificial lake, stocked with fish. The conquerors had to burn down the castle.

In 1276–1277, Scalovia was subjugated by the Teutonic Knights. In the chronicles of the Knights were mentioned the nobles Sarecka (Sareikā), Surbantas, Svirdotas and Surdota. In 1281, Jondele Schalwithe got the first "Landesprivileg," and in 1289 the castle of order Ragnit was built. Between 1281 and 1383, privileges were made out: 1338 in Pleikischken near Plaschken, 1312 and 1333 near Sasavo in the region between Laugßargen and Tauragė, 1307 in Sintine near Tilsit, 1307 Gigen (near present-day Pagėgiai), 1309 Linkone, 1350 Linkonen (Linkuhnen) as well as Weinoten near Tilsit, Tusseinen near Ragnit and Linkuhnen. Lithuanian immigrants were Sipe (1339) and the brothers Pogins and Skirgaila (1359). In 1411, a campaign of the Samogitians under their leader Rumbaudas Valimantaitis against the castles of Ragnit, Tilsit and Splitter is testified.

The last mention of the Scalovians was between 1542 (inhabitants of the castle of Ragnit) and 1563 (inhabitants of Splitter).

Language

Skalvian, or Scalovian, is the presumed West Baltic language or dialect of the Skalvians. It could also haven been a transitional language between Eastern and Western Baltic languages.

Literature
 Balys, Jonas: Grundzüge der Kleinlitauischen Volksdichtung, in Tolkemita-Texte “Lieder aus Schalauen” Nr.53, Dieburg 1997
 Eckert, Rainer/ Bukevičiute, Elvire-Julia/ Hinze, Friedhelm: Die baltischen Sprachen, eine Einführung, Langenscheidt 1994, 5. Auflage 1998
 Lepa, Gerhard (Hrsg): Die Schalauer, Die Stämme der Prußen, Tolkemita-Texte 52, Dieburg 1997
 Matulaitis, K.A.: Die Schalauer des Altertums, Tauto praeitis II, 2, 1965, in Tolkemita Texte, Dieburg 1997
 Salemke, Gerhard: Lagepläne der Wallburganlagen von der ehemaligen Provinz Ostpreußen, Gütersloh, 2005
 Salys, Anatanas: Schalauen, Lietuviu Enciklopedija, 1962, Boston, Band 27, S. 536–541, aus dem Litauischen in Tolkemita-Texte 52, Dieburg 1997
 Salys, Anton: Die zemaitischen Mundarten, Teil 1: Geschichte des zemaitischen Sprachgebiets Tauta ir Zodis, Bd-VI Kaunas 1930 (= Diss. Leipzig 1930)
 Tettau, v.: Volkssagen Ostpreußens, Litthauens und Westpreußens, Berlin 1837, S.10
 Trautmann, Reinhold: Über die sprachliche Stellung der Schalwen. Streitberg Festgabe Leipzig 1924, S.355 ff

References

Historical Baltic peoples
Old Prussians
People from Prussia proper